The Poor Law Medical Officers Association was formed in 1868 by a merger of the Poor Law Medical Reform Association and the Association of Metropolitan Workhouse Medical Officers.

Joseph Rogers was the founder and for some time president.

See also 

 Metropolitan Poor Act 1867
 Medical officer of health

References

Poor law infirmaries
Medical associations based in the United Kingdom